Taḥannuth was a religious practice undertaken in pre- and early Islamic Arabia, in which the participant spend time in isolation, turning away from paganism.

Etymology
According to Bleeker, the term taḥannuth has been interpreted in several ways. Traditionally, taḥannuth means spending time in seclusion, as practiced by the Quraysh, the chief tribe of Mecca in the 6th and 7th century, and the prophet Muhammad, who each year spend time in isolation at mount Hira', where he also received his revelations. According to Ibn Hisham and al-Tabari, taḥannuth may be interpreted as tabarrur, "the holding of pious exercises." Taḥannuth is also read as ''taḥannuf, that is, al-hanifyya, the religion of the hanif. Al-Bukhari interprets taḥannuth as ta'abbud, "worshipping." According to Bleeker, taḥannuth may also be traced to Hebrew tehinnot, private prayers. A third possibility is that it is derived from hinth, sin, meaning "purifying from sin, avoidance of sin," the sin of paganism, akin to the Henrew-Aramaic root h-n-ph, to be a pagan. In that case, taḥannuth means "turning away from paganism."

See also
 Hanif

References

Sources

External links
 Tahannuth, WikiShia
 The Prophet Muḥammad (SAW)’s practice of ‘taḥannuth’ or ‘taḥannuf’ (Haykal)
 Sally Mallam, The Community of Believers

Islamic terminology